An annular solar eclipse occurred at the Moon's ascending node of the orbit on August 10, 1980, centred over the Pacific Ocean. A solar eclipse occurs when the Moon passes between Earth and the Sun, thereby totally or partly obscuring the image of the Sun for a viewer on Earth. An annular solar eclipse occurs when the Moon's apparent diameter is smaller than the Sun's, blocking most of the Sun's light and causing the Sun to look like an annulus (ring). An annular eclipse appears as a partial eclipse over a region of the Earth thousands of kilometres wide. Annularity was visible in Tabuaeran of Kiribati, Peru, Bolivia, northern Paraguay and Brazil. Occurring 5 days before apogee (Apogee on Friday, August 15, 1980), the Moon's apparent diameter was smaller. At greatest eclipse, the Sun was 79 degrees (4,470 arc-minutes, or 284,400 arc-seconds) above horizon.

Related eclipses

Eclipses in 1980 
 A total solar eclipse on Saturday, 16 February 1980.
 A penumbral lunar eclipse on Saturday, 1 March 1980.
 A penumbral lunar eclipse on Sunday, 27 July 1980.
 An annular solar eclipse on Sunday, 10 August 1980.
 A penumbral lunar eclipse on Tuesday, 26 August 1980.

Solar eclipses of 1979–1982

Saros 135 

It is a part of Saros cycle 135, repeating every 18 years, 11 days, containing 71 events. The series started with partial solar eclipse on July 5, 1331. It contains annular eclipses from October 21, 1511, through February 24, 2305, hybrid eclipses on March 8, 2323, and March 18, 2341, and total eclipses from March 29, 2359, through May 22, 2449. The series ends at member 71 as a partial eclipse on August 17, 2593. The longest duration of totality will be 2 minutes, 27 seconds on May 12, 2431.

Tritos series

Metonic series

Notes

References

1980 8 10
1980 in science
1980 8 10
August 1980 events